Nicolaas Roosendael (1634, Hoorn – 1686, Amsterdam), was a Dutch Golden Age painter.

Biography
According to Houbraken he was the companion of Jacob Toorenvliet on his trip to Italy, but it is unknown whether he joined the bentvueghels with him or not.

According to the RKD he travelled to Rome in 1670. On his return he settled in Amsterdam, where he made many pieces for the Begijnhof.

References

Nicolaas Roosendael on Artnet

1634 births
1686 deaths
Dutch Golden Age painters
Dutch male painters
People from Hoorn